Smolnitsa is a village in Alutaguse Parish, Ida-Viru County, in northeastern Estonia. It is located on the northern shore of Lake Peipus. Smolnitsa has a population of 19 (as of 2000).

See also
Smolnitsa Landscape Conservation Area

References

Villages in Ida-Viru County